Eduardo Cordero Fernández (12 September 1921 – 3 September 1991) was a Chilean basketball player. He competed in the men's tournament at the 1948 Summer Olympics and the 1952 Summer Olympics.

References

External links

1921 births
1991 deaths
Chilean men's basketball players
Olympic basketball players of Chile
Basketball players at the 1948 Summer Olympics
Basketball players at the 1952 Summer Olympics
People from Iquique
1950 FIBA World Championship players